Studnice is a municipality and village in Chrudim District in the Pardubice Region of the Czech Republic. It has about 500 inhabitants.

Administrative parts
Villages of Košinov and Zalíbené are administrative parts of Studnice.

References

External links

Villages in Chrudim District